The Baltimore–Columbia–Towson Metropolitan Statistical Area, also known as Central Maryland, is a Metropolitan Statistical Area (MSA) in Maryland as defined by the United States Office of Management and Budget (OMB).  As of the 2010 Census, the combined population of the seven counties is 2,710,489. The MSA has the fourth-highest median household income in the United States, at $66,970 in 2012.

Composition
The area includes the following counties:

Anne Arundel County
Baltimore City
Baltimore County
Carroll County
Harford County
Howard County
Queen Anne's County

Principal communities
The metropolitan area includes the following principal communities:
 Baltimore
 Columbia
 Towson
It also includes several other communities (not necessarily incorporated as cities or towns):
 Aberdeen
 Annapolis
 Bel Air
 Catonsville
 Dundalk
 Eldersburg
 Ellicott City
 Edgewood
 Glen Burnie
 Hanover
 Havre de Grace
 Jessup
 Joppatowne
 Owings Mills
 Westminster
In addition to its technical metropolitan area, Baltimore also receives a large number of commuters from cities such as York, Pennsylvania and the Washington Metropolitan Area.

History

Companies in metropolitan Baltimore
Four Fortune 1000 companies are headquartered in Greater Baltimore: Grace Chemicals (in Columbia), Legg Mason, T. Rowe Price, and McCormick & Company (in Hunt Valley). Other companies headquartered in Greater Baltimore include AAI Corporation (in Hunt Valley), Adams Express Company, Brown Advisory, Alex Brown, First Home Mortgage Corporation, FTI Consulting, Petroleum & Resources Corporation, Vertis, Prometric, Sylvan Learning, Laureate Education, Under Armour, DAP, 180s, DeBaufre Bakeries, Wm. T. Burnett & Co, Old Mutual Financial Network, Firaxis Games (in Sparks), Sinclair Broadcast Group (in Hunt Valley), and Fila USA (in Sparks).

Government and infrastructure
The capital of Maryland and the agencies of the Maryland state government are located in the Baltimore MSA, mainly in Annapolis and Baltimore City. The area is also home to the National Security Agency (NSA) headquarters in Fort Meade in Anne Arundel County, as well as the Social Security Administration and the Centers for Medicare & Medicaid Services (CMS) in Woodlawn in Baltimore County.

Sports teams in metropolitan Baltimore

Baltimore Orioles – Major League Baseball (since 1954)
Baltimore Ravens – National Football League (since 1996)
Baltimore Burn – Women's Spring Football League (since 2001)
Baltimore Nighthawks – Independent Women's Football League (since 2008)
Charm City Roller Girls – Women's Flat Track Derby Association (since 2006)
Coppin State Eagles
Johns Hopkins Blue Jays, competes in Division I for men's and women's lacrosse only
Loyola Greyhounds
Morgan State Bears

In Baltimore County:
Towson Tigers, in Towson
UMBC Retrievers, in Catonsville
Baltimore Blast – Major Arena Soccer League (since 2014)

In Anne Arundel County:
Navy Midshipmen, in Annapolis
Chesapeake Bayhawks, in Annapolis
Maryland Black Bears, in Odenton

See also

 Baltimore–Washington Metropolitan Area
 Mid-Atlantic states
 Northeast megalopolis
 Delmarva

Notes

 

 
Metropolitan areas of Maryland
Regions of Maryland